Mission Creek is a stream in Pine County, in the U.S. state of Minnesota. It is a tributary of the Snake River.

Mission Creek took its name from an Ojibwe Indian mission founded near the creek in 1836.

See also
List of rivers of Minnesota

References

Rivers of Pine County, Minnesota
Rivers of Minnesota